Fakhra Salimi (born 18 November 1957 in Lahore, Pakistan) is a Pakistani-born Norwegian human rights activist, feminist, journalist and editor. She is founder and executive director of the MiRA Resource Centre for Black, Immigrant and Refugee Women. The centre has consultative status with the United Nations Economic and Social Council and is under the royal patronage of Queen Sonja of Norway.

She has been a member of the board of directors of the Norwegian Centre Against Racism (1980–2003), a co-founder and member of the board of the directors of the Forum for Women and Development (1990–1995), a member of the advisory council of the Norwegian Study of Power and Democracy (1998–2003), a board member of Oslo University College, a jury member of the Norwegian government's Human Rights Prize for Journalists (2005–2009), and was a co-founder and the first vice president of the Norwegian Women's Lobby.

Salimi moved to Norway in 1979, and has studied sociology, anthropology, and media and communication studies. She worked as a journalist with the NRK in the early 1980s. Her brother Khalid Salimi is also a prominent human rights activist in Norway.

Awards
Gender Equality Prize of the Confederation of Vocational Unions, 1999
Ossietzky Prize of PEN Norway, 2005
Public Health Prize, 2005
Girls' Prize of Plan Norway
Prize for the Advancement of the Rule of Law (Rettssikkerhetsprisen) of the Norwegian Association of Lawyers, 2015
Medal of St. Hallvard, 2015

References

Norwegian human rights activists
Norwegian feminists
Pakistani emigrants to Norway
1957 births
Living people
Norwegian Association for Women's Rights people